The 1974 Formula 750 season was the second season of the FIM Formula 750 Prize. The series was originally planned for seven events, but when it was realised that the Yamaha TZ750 hadn't yet been homologized by the FIM and wouldn't be eligible to compete, several of the race organisers changed their races from F750 to open class to allow the Yamaha to compete. Only 3 events remained on the calendar for the Formula 750 Prize. The series was won by Australian John Dodds.

Calendar

Championship standings

See also
 1974 Grand Prix motorcycle racing season

References

Formula 750
1974 in motorcycle sport